Nancy Wilson Ross (November 22, 1901 – January 18, 1986) was an American novelist.  A native of Olympia, Washington who graduated from the University of Oregon in 1924, she became an expert in Eastern religions and wrote fifteen novels. Her 1957 novel The Return of Lady Brace was nominated for the National Book Award for Fiction.

Books
Friday to Monday (1932)
Take the Lightning (1940) 
The Farthest Reach (1941) 
Westward the Women (1944)
The Left Hand Is the Dreamer (1947)
I, My Ancestor (1950)
Joan of Arc (1952)
Time's Corner (1952)
The Return of Lady Brace (1957)
Thor's Visit to the Land of Giants (1959)
Heroines of the Early West (1960) 
The World of Zen: an East-West Anthology (1960)
Three Ways of Asian Wisdom (1966) 
Buddhism, a Way of Life and Thought (1980)

References

External links
Nancy Wilson Ross papers at University of Texas at Austin

20th-century American novelists
American women novelists
1901 births
1986 deaths
20th-century American women writers
Zen Buddhism writers
University of Oregon alumni
Place of death missing
Writers from Olympia, Washington